Ragnar Arved Arvedson, (4 December 1895 – 2 October 1973) was a Swedish actor, director, writer and producer.
Arvedson appeared in about 50 roles in films between 1920 and 1970 and directed about 20 films between 1935 and 1949.

Selected filmography
 Thomas Graal's Ward (1922)
 A Maid Among Maids (1924)
 Charles XII (1925)
 Her Little Majesty (1925)
 The Lady of the Camellias (1925)
 She Is the Only One (1926)
 His English Wife (1927)
 A Perfect Gentleman (1927)
 The Devil and the Smalander (1927)
 Sin (1928)
 Cavaliers of the Crown (1930)
 For Her Sake (1930)
 Dangerous Paradise (1931)
 Kanske en gentleman (1935)
 The Ghost of Bragehus (1936)
 The Wedding Trip (1936)
 Poor Millionaires (1936)
 Happy Vestköping (1937)
Lucky Young Lady (1941)
 How to Tame a Real Man (1941)
 In Darkest Smaland (1943)
 Gentleman with a Briefcase (1943)
 Elvira Madigan (1943)
 The Girls in Smaland (1945)
 Brita in the Merchant's House (1946)
 Dinner for Two (1947)
 Flickan från tredje raden (1949)
 The Street (1949)
 In Lilac Time (1952)
 The Chieftain of Göinge (1953)
 Young Summer (1954)
 The Magnificent Lie (1955)
 Flicka i kasern (1955)
 Voyage in the Night (1955)
 The Summer Wind Blows (1955)
 Getting Married (1955)
 The Biscuit (1956)
 Bill Bergson Lives Dangerously (1957)
 A Lion in Town (1959)
 The Devil's Eye (1960)
 On a Bench in a Park (1960)
 Night Games (1966)

References

External links

1895 births
1973 deaths
Swedish male film actors
Swedish film directors
Swedish male silent film actors
People from Linköping
20th-century Swedish male actors
20th-century Swedish screenwriters
20th-century Swedish male writers